The 2016–17 Gamma Ethniki Cup is the 3rd season of the competition, since its official establishment in 2013, and the first to take place after the 2015–16 edition was not held. In this competition, only the clubs of the Gamma Ethniki can participate. The 2016–17 Gamma Ethniki Cup winner will compete at the end of the season with the winner of the 2016–17 Amateurs' Cup for the Amateurs' Super Cup Greece.

First round
In first round of the competition, the clubs in each group compete against each other in singles matches (overtime and penalties apply) until one club is declared Group winner. The pairs are the result of random drawing. The match days of the First Round have been set for 16 October 2016 for Match-Day 1, 13 November 2016 for Match-Day 2, 14 December 2016 for Match-Day 3 and 22 February 2017 for each Group Final. However, all matches scheduled for 13 November were postponed via a direct order of the HFF, in association with UEFA and FIFA, in response to the arson of Superleague Chief Refereeing Officer Georgios Mpikas' house in Ierissos, Chalkidiki. As a result, all Match-Day 2 matches were set for 7 December 2016, while Match-Day 3 matches were set for 21 December 2016.

Group 1

Match-day 1

 	

|}
Kavala advance to Match-day 2 on walkover.

Match-day 2

|}

Match-day 3

|}

Group Final

|}

Group 2

Match-day 1

 	

|}

Match-day 2

|}

Match-day 3

|}

Group Final

|}

Group 3

Match-day 1

 	

|}
Fostiras advance to Match-day 2 on walkover.

Match-day 2

|}

Match-day 3

|}

Group Final

|}

Group 4

Match-day 1 

 	

|}
Panthiraikos advance to Match-day 2 on walkover.

Match-day 2

|}

Match-day 3

|}

Group Final

|}

Bracket

Semifinals
In the Second Round (Semi-finals), the four Group winners compete on neutral Ground on single knockout matches.

Final

References

External links
Football League 2 Cup

2017
2016–17 in Greek football